Emil Kruse (born March 21, 1995) is a Swedish professional ice hockey goaltender. He is currently playing with Västerås IK in the Swedish Allsvenskan.

Kruse made his Swedish Hockey League debut playing with Brynäs IF during the 2014–15 SHL season.

References

External links

1995 births
BIK Karlskoga players
Brynäs IF players
Living people
Rögle BK players
Swedish ice hockey goaltenders